Mark Makora Mbogo (born September 23, 1997), known professionally as KayCyy or KayCyy Pluto, is a Kenyan-American rapper, singer and songwriter.

Born in Kenya, Mbogo moved with his family to St. Paul, Minnesota at an early age. Throughout his career, he has released five mixtapes, and several singles with his debut studio album Who Is KayCyy? set to release within 2023. KayCyy has worked as a songwriter and credited vocalist alongside several major artists, including Kanye West, Lil Baby, Lil Wayne, and Travis Scott amongst others. Most notably, KayCyy had a large contribution towards the production of  West's tenth studio album Donda, writing and recording references for a multitude of tracks.

Early life 
Mark Makora Mbogo was born in Nairobi, Kenya on September 23, 1997. At the age of nine, he and his family moved to the United States, landing at the state of Minnesota. He attended Tartan High School in the city of Oakdale a suburb east of St. Paul, where he graduated from in 2016. After high school, he moved to New York and later Los Angeles in pursuit of his music career.

Career 
In 2016, Mbogo signed to Alive Productions, a record label founded by music producer Reefa, with him later leaving in 2021.

The rapper has released two of his own studio albums, Patient Enough and Ups & Downs, in 2020 and 2021 respectively. A third album, titled Who Is KayCyy?, is set to be released in 2022.

Mbogo has worked with multiple other artists, having writing credits on Lil Wayne's album Funeral and Kanye West's single "Wash Us in the Blood".

Mbogo has worked closely with West since 2019. The rappers met through record executive Abou "Bu" Thiam, who later became West's manager, as well as KayCyy's. KayCyy is currently signed to Bu's record label BuVision and Columbia Records and is credited as a performer and writer on West's tenth studio album Donda, including on the single "Hurricane", which topped multiple international song charts.

Mbogo was nominated for a Grammy Award for Album of the Year for his work on Kanye's studio album Donda, and won a Grammy Award for contributing background vocals to the single, "Hurricane" by Kanye West which won Grammy Award for Best Melodic Rap Performance. Mbogo released a collaborative EP with Gesaffelstein titled TW20 50 on March 11, 2022, and he released the mixtape, Get Used To It on June 2, 2022.

Discography

Studio albums

Extended Plays

Mixtapes

Other charted songs

References 

1997 births
Living people
21st-century American rappers
African-American male rappers
African-American songwriters
American male rappers
Musicians from Minnesota
Kenyan rappers
Rappers from Minnesota
Songwriters from Minnesota
21st-century African-American musicians
American male songwriters
Artists from Minnesota
Artists from Minneapolis
Culture of Minneapolis
Rappers from Minneapolis